The Menza is a river in Zabaykalsky Krai in Russia, and Töv Province, Mongolia. It is the largest tributary of the Chikoy.

Course
The Menza has its source in the northern part of the Khentii Mountains in Mongolia. It flows across mountainous areas, first northeastwards, entering Zabaykalsky Krai, then bends to the northwest across the western edge of the Khentei-Daur Highlands, joining the Chikoy on its left bank. The Burkal (Буркал) is its most important tributary.

See also
List of rivers of Russia
Chikoy National Park

References

External links

Rivers of Zabaykalsky Krai
Rivers of Mongolia
Mongolia–Russia border